Jehoram (meaning "Jehovah is exalted" in Biblical Hebrew) was the name of several individuals in the Tanakh. The female version of this name is Athaliah.

The son of Toi, King of Hamath who was sent by his father to congratulate David on the occasion of his victory over Hadadezer (2 Samuel 8:10)
Jehoram of Israel or Joram, King of Israel (ruled c. 852/49–842/41)
Jehoram of Judah or Joram, King of Judah (ruled c. 849/48–842/41)
A Levite of the family of Gershom (1 Chronicles 26:25)
A priest sent by Jehoshaphat to instruct the people in Judah (2 Chronicles 17:8)

In modern days, it is also the name of:

Yehoram Gaon (born 1939), Israeli singer and actor